Daniel Peter Graves (born August 7, 1973) is a Vietnamese-born American former Major League Baseball pitcher. Born to a Vietnamese mother and an American serviceman father, he is the only Vietnam-born player in the history of the major leagues and one of the few American players of Vietnamese descent. Graves pitched for most of his career for the Cincinnati Reds, where he was team's saves leader each year from 1999–2004, except for 2003 when he was a starting pitcher.

Early life
Graves was born in Saigon to Thao and Jim Graves, a U.S. Army sergeant, during the Vietnam War. The family fled the country when Graves was 14 months old after they learned of the impending fall of Saigon. After settling in the United States, Graves and his brother, Frank, spoke Vietnamese until teasing from classmates caused them to abandon the language.

High school and college
He graduated from Brandon High School in Brandon, Florida, and was awarded a baseball scholarship to the University of Miami. As a right-handed relief pitcher for the school as a junior, he posted a 0.89 earned run average and led collegiate baseball with a school-record 21 saves.

Major League Baseball
Graves was selected by the Cleveland Indians in the fourth round of the 1994 Major League Baseball draft. Two days after being drafted, he tore his ACL during the College World Series. He was traded to the Cincinnati Reds in July .

In his first nine seasons with Cleveland and Cincinnati, Graves compiled a 40–42 record as a pitcher with 406 strikeouts, a 3.89 ERA, and 172 saves in 755.2 innings. He is the only player ever to have more than one season in which all his hits were home runs.

In 2003, Graves was converted into a starter. He went 4–14 as a starter in 26 starts.

In 2004, Graves was again used as a closer. On April 16, 2004, Graves gave up a milestone and game tying home run to Sammy Sosa in the bottom of the ninth inning. The game ended two pitches later, with Graves allowing a walk off home run to Moisés Alou. Graves went on to save 41 games in the 2004 season.

The 2005 season did not start well for Graves. He struggled, posting a 7.36 ERA through 20 games. Fans in Cincinnati took notice and consistently booed Graves, leading up to a May 23 incident when Graves made an obscene hand gesture to a fan that leaned in the dugout after being called a "gook" while getting taken out of the game by Reds manager Dave Miley. Graves was quickly released by the Reds after the incident. He was later signed as a free agent by the New York Mets on June 11, 2005.

After putting up a 5.89 ERA with the Mets, he was designated for assignment on August 23, 2005. He cleared waivers and was sent to Triple-A Norfolk on August 26, but was called back up to the Mets when rosters expanded. Graves was 0–2 with an 18.00 ERA in five games with Norfolk.

On December 19, 2005, Graves signed a minor league contract with the Cleveland Indians. He pitched well in spring training, earning a spot in the Indian bullpen, but was designated for assignment on May 12,  after he opened the season with a 2–1 record and 5.79 ERA in 13 relief appearances.

On May 18, 2006, Graves was assigned to the Indians' Triple-A affiliate, the Buffalo Bisons, in Buffalo. He finished the 2006 season with the Bisons, with a 4.01 ERA (1 Win 1 Loss).

Graves signed a minor league deal with the Rockies on December 19, 2006. He was released during Spring training in March 2007 prior to the season. During the 2007 season, Graves was on the roster of the Long Island Ducks of the independent Atlantic League of Professional Baseball, leading the league in saves.

Graves later signed with the Minnesota Twins on March 30, and played for the Triple-A Rochester Red Wings most of the year. He became a free agent at the end of the season and signed a minor league contract with the Houston Astros in January . He was released by the Astros on March 25, .

Broadcasting career
Graves is now a baseball analyst on 120 Sports, "The Rally" on Bally Sports network, MLB.com, MLB Network Radio Sirius XM, and ESPN Radio. He joined the Reds Radio Network to do color commentary for select games in 2018.

Personal life
Graves is married with two children and has four children from a previous marriage.

References

External links

Vietnamese American Pitcher a Man for All Seasons
Danny Graves official website 
Reds: Graves is still just a big kid 
National Public Radio story about Graves "Bringing Baseball to Vietnam" – audio archive

1973 births
Living people
Sportspeople from Ho Chi Minh City
Major League Baseball players from Vietnam
Vietnamese people of American descent
Vietnamese emigrants to the United States
Major League Baseball pitchers
Cleveland Indians players
Cincinnati Reds players
New York Mets players
Mayos de Navojoa players
National League All-Stars
Miami Hurricanes baseball players
Kinston Indians players
Canton-Akron Indians players
Buffalo Bisons (minor league) players
Indianapolis Indians players
Norfolk Tides players
Long Island Ducks players
Rochester Red Wings players
New Britain Rock Cats players
Fort Myers Miracle players
American sportspeople of Vietnamese descent
All-American college baseball players
Major League Baseball broadcasters
Cincinnati Reds announcers
American expatriate baseball players in Mexico